Gol Zard-e Pain (also Romanized as Gol Zard-e Pā‘īn; also known as Gol Zard and Gol Zard-e Soflá) is a village in Kuhdasht-e Jonubi Rural District, in the Central District of Kuhdasht County, Lorestan Province, Iran. At the 2006 census, its population was 85, in 14 families.

References 

Towns and villages in Kuhdasht County